Alan Charles Bird (born 4 July 1938, in Bromley, Kent, UK) is an English ophthalmologist, famous for his work on degenerative and hereditary diseases of the retina.

Bird was educated from 1949 to 1956 at Bromley Grammar School and from 1956 to 1961 at Guy's Hospital Medical School, where he studied neurology and neurosurgery and received his Bachelor of Medicine, Bachelor of Surgery (equivalent of MD in the United States). From July 1961 to January 1965 he held successive appointments at several hospitals in London. From January 1964 to December 1967 he served his ophthalmic residency at Moorfields Eye Hospital, then worked from December 1967 to June 1968 as senior registrar at the Royal London Hospital and the National Hospital for Nervous Diseases. From July 1968 to August 1969 he held a clinical fellowship in neuro-ophthalmology at Bascom Palmer Eye Institute, working with Lawton Smith, MD. Dr. Bird returned to Moorfield's in August 1969 and from 1969 to 1976 held successive appointed to the Institute of Ophthalmology as lecturer, senior lecturer and reader and then from 1976 to 2006 as professor, simultaneously serving as consultant at Moorfields Eye Hospital.

Dr. Bird is the author or co-author of more than 400 publications in peer-reviewed journals. He has given numerous named lectures in Europe and North America.

He is married and the father of two children.

Awards and honours
1981 — Duke-Elder Medal of the Ophthalmic Society of the United Kingdom
1981 — Prix Chauvin, la Société Française d'Ophtalmologie
1990 — Doyne Medal of the Oxford Ophthalmological Congress
1994 — Jackson Memorial Lectureship of the American Academy of Ophthalmology
1994 — Kayser Award of the International Congress of Eye Research
1997 — Donders Medal of the Netherlands Ophthalmological Society
1997 — Gass Medal of the Macular Society
1998 — Jules François Medal of the International Council of Ophthalmology
2002 — Bowman Medal of the Royal College of Ophthalmology
2004 — Helen Keller Prize of the Helen Keller Foundation
2004 — Alcon Research Award
2008 — Laureate Recognition Award of the American Academy of Ophthalmology
2010 — Gonin Medal of the International Council of Ophthalmology

References

1938 births
Living people
British ophthalmologists